Republic Records is a New York City–based American record label owned by Universal Music Group (UMG). It was founded by Avery Lipman and Monte Lipman as an independent label in 1995, and was acquired by UMG in 2000. Republic was initially an imprint of the Universal/Motown Records Group, and was renamed Universal Republic Records after a reorganization in 2006 before going back to its original name in 2012.

History

Foundation and Universal Records: 1994–2005 
According to Avery Lipman, he and his brother Monte conceived the idea for Republic Records at their apartment in New York. Lipman stated that both had previously been employed by record companies and were in between jobs at the time. They began putting records out as a hobby, the first of which was the Bloodhound Gang's Dingleberry Haze. Republic Records was formed in 1995 as a subsidiary of MCA's Geffen Records, but soon after its foundation, the distribution changed to the newly established Universal Records.

In January 2000, it was announced that the Universal Music Group acquired the Lipman brothers' Republic Records as a wholly owned subsidiary. Monte Lipman was named president of the Universal Records label, while Avery Lipman became Republic's president.

Universal Republic Records: 2006–2012 
In 2006, corporate restructuring saw the formation of Universal Republic Records through a merger between the two labels. Monte Lipman became the president and CEO of the restructured label while Avery Lipman served as co-president and COO. Other changes were made at the label's parent, Universal Motown Republic Group, during the summer of 2011. Universal Motown Records was shut down, transferring its artists to the newly recreated Motown Records or Universal Republic Records. Universal Republic Records became a stand-alone label and the Universal Motown Republic Group was shut down. In August 2011, the restructured Universal Republic signed Ariana Grande to a record contract.

Republic Records revival: 2012–present 
In October 2012, Universal Republic Records returned to the Republic Records moniker. Just prior to the label's return to the Republic name, it signed Canadian artist, The Weeknd, through his imprint label, XO. In addition to artists' albums, the label has released soundtracks with the Fox Broadcasting Company (Star), NBC (The Voice), and former UMG parent Universal Pictures (Fifty Shades and Sing), among numerous other partnerships, films, and television series. Republic Records had songs in six of the top-10 spots on the Mediabase Top 40 Chart in 2015, tying a 2013 record. Also in 2015, the label signed American rapper and singer, Post Malone.

In November 2017, the company was named Varietys Hitmaker Label of the Year. In 2018, Taylor Swift signed to Republic Records after releasing her music through the Republic imprint, Big Machine Records, for a majority of her career. In December of that year, Republic partnered with Sony Pictures on the release of the soundtrack for Spider-Man: Into the Spider-Verse. The soundtrack's lead single was Post Malone and Swae Lee's "Sunflower" which reached number one on the Billboard Hot 100 and broke the record for most weeks in the top ten of the Hot R&B/Hip-Hop Songs chart at 45. Early 2019 saw the signing of a reunited Jonas Brothers, as well.

Also in 2019, Republic Records was named the "Label of the Year" by both Billboard and Variety. It has been Billboards label of the year for 4 of the last 5 years and Varietys for each of the last three. Republic was also named Billboards Hot 100 Label of the Year for the sixth straight time. Five Republic albums (Ariana Grande's Thank U, Next, Taylor Swift's Lover, Post Malone's Beerbongs & Bentleys, Drake's Scorpion and Post Malone's Hollywood's Bleeding) also appeared in the top 10 of the year-end Billboard 200 chart.

In 2020, Republic Records partnered up with JYP Entertainment for the South Korean girl group Twice as the group's first American label and distributor. Twice will be first artist from JYP Entertainment to be powered under the alliance. Twice's signing represents a diversifying market for K-pop in the US. On April 8, 2020, it was stated that the record has partnered up with the South Korean girl group (G)I-dle after the release of their third EP I Trust, marking the group's official debut in the US.

Republic Records became the first label to partner with DistroKid, allowing it to mine data from the company looking for new artists. The initiative began in 2021 and allowed DistroKid to receive a finder's fee for any new artist signed to the label. In January 2021, the label had five of the top seven albums on the Billboard 200 chart, including the top three spots with Morgan Wallen's Dangerous: The Double Album, Taylor Swift's Evermore, and Pop Smoke's Shoot for the Stars, Aim for the Moon. The Weeknd's After Hours and Ariana Grande's Positions were sixth and seventh respectively. That month, Republic also had six of the top ten albums on the Rolling Stone album chart and nine of the top 20 songs on the Rolling Stone song chart. In March 2021, Taylor Swift became the first Republic artist to win the Grammy Award for Album of the Year for her album, Folklore. On November 24, 2021, Jim Roppo and Wendy Goldstein were named co-presidents of Republic Records.

In July 2022, Universal Music Group formally launched and expanded the Republic Records imprint in international markets. The label made its launch in the Philippines via its local subsidiary UMG Philippines, with domestic artists Darren Espanto, Elha Nympha and Zack Tabudlo among other artists who were signed to the label.

Releases 

Republic Records released the Bloodhound Gang's 1994 EP, Dingleberry Haze, and their first LP, Use Your Fingers. Kevin Rudolf's single, "Let It Rock", was certified triple platinum by the Recording Industry Association of America. Jay Sean's debut single, "Down", sold six million copies in the United States and received a large airplay on radio worldwide. Sean's follow-up single, "Do You Remember", sold over one million copies.

American singer-songwriter Taylor Swift recorded with Nashville-based Big Machine Records. Swift is a quadruple-platinum artist with 11 Grammy Awards and over 175 million units moved worldwide as of 2014. As her contract with Big Machine ended in 2018, she signed with Republic, with her first single "ME!" with the label released on April 26, 2019. Jack Johnson has received a number of gold and platinum certifications. Damian Marley's debut album was certified gold and sold one million copies worldwide.

Other prominent Republic releases in recent years have come from acts like Ariana Grande (2013's Yours Truly, 2014's My Everything, 2016's Dangerous Woman, 2018's Sweetener, 2019's Thank U, Next, and 2020's Positions); the Jonas Brothers (2019's Happiness Begins); Taylor Swift (2019's Lover, 2020's Folklore and Evermore, 2021's Fearless (Taylor's Version) and Red (Taylor's Version), and 2022's Midnights); The Weeknd (2013's Kiss Land, 2015's Beauty Behind the Madness, 2016's Starboy, 2020s After Hours, and 2022's Dawn FM); Florence and the Machine (2015's How Big, How Blue, How Beautiful and 2018's High as Hope); Lorde (2013's Pure Heroine, 2017's Melodrama, and 2021's Solar Power); James Blake (2019's Assume Form); Pearl Jam (2020's Gigaton); Poppy (2022's Stagger) and Kim Petras (2019's Clarity and Turn Off the Light).

Artists

As of 2022, the current Republic Records roster includes Amanda Reifer, Ariana Grande, BoyWithUke, Drake, Benee, James Bay, James Blake, Kid Cudi, Florence + the Machine, Seth MacFarlane, John Mellencamp, Julia Michaels, Post Malone, Of Monsters and Men, Hailee Steinfeld, Taylor Swift, Shania Twain, Twice, Stevie Wonder, Conan Gray, Peach PRC, Kim Petras and FLO.

Associated labels and imprints

 21 Entertainment
 American Recordings
 Anti  
 Uptown Records
 Aware Records
 Beauty Marks Entertainment
 Big Hit Music 
 Boominati Worldwide
 Brushfire Records
 Casablanca Records
 Cash Money Records 
 Electric Feel Records
 Galactic Records
 Federal Films
 The Heavy Group
 Hikari-Ultra 
 Imperial Music
 Lava Records
 Mercury Records
 Monkeywrench Records
 Real World Records 
 Republic Kids
 Republic Nashville 
 School Boy Records
 Victor Victor Worldwide
 Taylor Swift 
 Wicked Awesome Records
 XO
 Young Money Entertainment

References

External links 
 
 

 
Alternative rock record labels
American record labels
New York (state) record labels